Yun Jiwan (1635–1718) was a scholar-official of the Joseon Dynasty Korea in 17th and 18th centuries.

He was also diplomat and ambassador, representing Joseon interests in the 7th Edo period diplomatic mission to the Tokugawa shogunate in Japan.

1682 mission to Japan
In 1682, King Sukjong of Joseon caused a mission to be sent to Japan; and Yun Jiwan was the chief emissary.  This diplomatic mission functioned to the advantage of both the Japanese and the Koreans as a channel for developing a political foundation for trade.

This delegation was explicitly identified by the Joseon court as a "Communication Envoy" (tongsinsa).  The mission was understood to signify that relations were "normalized."

See also
 Joseon diplomacy
 Joseon missions to Japan
 Joseon tongsinsa

Notes

References

 Daehwan, Noh.  "The Eclectic Development of Neo-Confucianism and Statecraft from the 18th to the 19th Century," Korea Journal (Winter 2003).
 Lewis, James Bryant. (2003). Frontier contact between chosŏn Korea and Tokugawa Japan. London: Routledge. 
 Walker, Brett L.  "Foreign Affairs and Frontiers in Early Modern Japan: A Historiographical Essay," Early Modern Japan. Fall, 2002, pp. 44–62, 124–128.
 Walraven, Boudewijn and Remco E. Breuker. (2007). Korea in the middle: Korean studies and area studies; Essays in Honour of Boudewijn Walraven. Leiden: CNWS Publications. ;

External links
 Joseon Tongsinsa Cultural Exchange Association ; 
 조선통신사연구 (Journal of Studies in Joseon Tongsinsa) 

1635 births
1718 deaths
17th-century Korean people
Korean diplomats
Papyeong Yun clan